The Ramones Museum is a museum dedicated to the American punk rock band the Ramones, located in the Kreuzberg borough of Berlin, Germany. While the Ramones are most closely associated with their hometown of New York City, bassist Dee Dee Ramone grew up in Berlin, and the city, and Germany as a whole, was mentioned in numerous Ramones songs.

Originally opening in 2005 in Kreuzberg, the museum moved to Mitte in 2008, then moved back to Kreuzberg in 2017. It is also used as an occasional concert venue.

In 2014 the museum started releasing records, the first being a split between the Zatopeks and Dee Cracks.

Layout
The museum has more than 1,000 objects of memorabilia originating from the band members themselves, including clothing, set lists, gear, and promotional items of the Ramones from the years 1975-1996. Many of the items were collected by museum founder Flo Hayler, and initially stored in his apartment.

Live performances
Since moving to its current location, the museum has hosted live performances by bands starting with Alkaline Trio doing an acoustic set in 2009. Later that year, C.J. Ramone became the first Ramone to perform at the museum. Other acts that have played include Against Me!, Anti-Flag, Brian Fallon, Dave Hause, Dead To Me, The Flatliners, Franz Nicolay, Hop Along, Jet, Mikey Erg (who released a free download of his set on bandcamp), Riverboat Gamblers, Slingshot Dakota, Smoke or Fire, The Static Age, The Subways, and Youth Brigade.

See also 
 List of music museums

References

Museums in Berlin
Ramones
Music museums in Germany
Biographical museums in Germany